The November 2020 massacres in Wukro was a mass extrajudicial killing that took place in Wukro in the Tigray Region of Ethiopia during the Tigray War, on 27-28 November 2020. Wukro is a mid-sized town, capital of woreda Kilte Awulaelo, Eastern zone of Tigray.

Massacre
The Ethiopian National Defense Force (ENDF) and Eritrean Defence Forces allegedly  killed 220 civilians in Wukro (Eastern Tigray) on 27–28 November 2020. At the arrival of the troops, many Wukro residents fled to the surrounding mountains, some recording the carnage with their cellphones. After that, angry Eritreans spent days looting homes, banks and factories and shooting dead scores of young men suspected of sympathising with the Tigrayan rebels. 
81 of the victims are buried at the back of an Orthodox church.

Perpetrators
Relatives and neighbours interpreted the identity of the perpetrators as Ethiopian and Eritrean soldiers.

Victims
The “Tigray: Atlas of the humanitarian situation” mentions a total of 245 victims, 14 on 16 November, 11 between 17 and 21 November, 20 on the 27th and 200 on the 28th. Many victims have been identified, but, as Wukro is a martyr town, affected by every phase of the Tigray war, the specific event in which victims died is not known yet. The EHRC–OHCHR Tigray investigation reported the massacres in this locality, without going into further detail.

Reactions
The series of massacres in Wukro received international attention in media articles. The “Tigray: Atlas of the humanitarian situation”, that documented this massacre received international media attention, particularly with regard its Annex A, that lists the massacres.

See also
 Bombing of Wukro
 Wukro massacre (December 2020)
 Wukro massacre (February 2021)
 Wukro massacre (March 2021)

References

External links
World Peace Foundation: Starving Tigray

2020 in Ethiopia
Conflicts in 2020
Massacres in 2020
Wars involving Eritrea
Wars involving Ethiopia
Massacres committed by Eritrea
2020 massacres of the Tigray War